The Varaždin–Golubovec railway is a  long local railway line in Croatia that connects Varaždin, Ivanec and Novi Golubovec with each other and is connected to further railway lines in Varaždin. It is non-electrified and single-tracked and used for both freight and passenger (local) transport.

Gallery

Maps

References

External links
 

Railway lines in Croatia